Juan Carlos Pouso Lejonagoitia (born 30 July 1960) is a Spanish former footballer who played as a forward, currently the manager of CD Calahorra.

He played no higher than Segunda División B, and spent most of his managerial career of over two decades at that same level. He led Eibar and Mirandés for one season each in Segunda División.

Football career
Born in Leioa, Basque Country, Pouso began working as a professional manager in 2000 with Arenas de Getxo. He was appointed at neighbouring Sestao River Club three years later, achieving two promotions to Segunda División B with the latter team. 

On 17 June 2008, Pouso became coach of Segunda División club SD Eibar, being granted a one-year leave from his job in the shipbuilding industry in order to fully dedicate himself to his new line of work. He was sacked in March 2009 after a poor run of results, being replaced by Josu Uribe as the season ended in relegation.

In late January 2010, Pouso returned to the third tier after being named manager of CD Guijuelo with the aim of avoiding relegation, which was eventually met. He signed with fellow league side CD Mirandés on 1 June, leading them to division two for the first time in their history in his second year and reaching the semi-finals of the Copa del Rey in the process.

On 30 June 2013, Mirandés decided not to renew Pouso's contract even though he managed to finish above the relegation zone. After one year of inactivity, he was appointed at UD Logroñés in the third division, leading his team to consecutive presences in the promotion play-offs albeit without success. Having resigned from his post in November 2016, he became the club's director of football.

On 6 February 2018, Pouso joined Racing de Santander on a deal until the end of the campaign, replacing the fired Ángel Viadero. He returned to work in November the following year, at Pontevedra CF.

Pouso was removed from his post at the Galician club in February 2020 after a run of eight games without a win, though he stayed in other functions until the end of the season. Thirteen months later, he was back at work at a Recreativo de Huelva side facing relegation from the third tier. He was unable to prevent El Decano from suffering an unprecedented double descent to the fifth division following a restructuring of the Spanish football league system.

On 26 December 2022, after more than a year without a club, Pouso was appointed the manager of Calahorra in the Primera Federación, replacing the sacked Juan García.

Managerial statistics

Honours

Manager
Sestao River
Tercera División: 2003–04, 2005–06

Mirandés
Segunda División B: 2011–12

References

External links
      

1960 births
Living people
People from Greater Bilbao
Sportspeople from Biscay
Spanish footballers
Footballers from the Basque Country (autonomous community)
Association football forwards
Segunda División B players
Tercera División players
Arenas Club de Getxo footballers
Sestao Sport Club footballers
SD Erandio Club players
Spanish football managers
Segunda División managers
Segunda División B managers
Tercera División managers
Arenas Club de Getxo managers
Sestao River managers
SD Eibar managers
CD Guijuelo managers
CD Mirandés managers
UD Logroñés managers
Racing de Santander managers
Pontevedra CF managers
Recreativo de Huelva managers